Susan Christina von Saltza (born January 13, 1944), also known by her married name Christina Olmstead, is an American former competition swimmer, Olympic champion, and former world record-holder in four events.

As an age group swimmer, von Saltza swam for coach George Haines' Santa Clara Swim Club and led the club to multiple team championships at the nationals, in addition to winning nineteen individual Amateur Athletic Union (AAU) titles. She was featured on the July 21, 1958 cover of Sports Illustrated magazine as the "No. 1 U.S. Swimmer at the Age of 14."

At the age of 16, she set the world record in the 400-meter freestyle at the U.S. Olympic trials, and proceeded to win four medals at the 1960 Summer Olympics in Rome. Individually, she won a gold medal in the women's 400-meter freestyle, and a silver in the 100-meter freestyle. She won two more gold medals as a member of the winning U.S. teams in the women's 4×100-meter freestyle relay and 4×100-meter medley relay. Both U.S. relay teams set new world records in their respective events.

A year prior to the Olympics, von Saltza won five gold medals at the 1959 Pan American Games. Her wins came in the 100-, 200-, and 400-meter freestyle, as well as the 4×100-meter freestyle and 4×100-meter medley relays.

Von Saltza later attended Stanford University, and graduated with a bachelor's degree in Asian history.  Stanford, like most major American universities, had no women's swimming and diving team prior to the enactment of Title IX, and von Saltza effectively retired from competition swimming after the 1960 Olympics.

Von Saltza is properly styled "the Baroness von Saltza," as her grandfather, Count Philip von Saltza, immigrated to the United States at the turn of the 20th century, and she is still recognized by her title in the Who's Who of Swedish Nobility.

Von Saltza was inducted into the International Swimming Hall of Fame as an "Honor Swimmer" in 1966.

See also
 List of members of the International Swimming Hall of Fame
 List of multiple Olympic gold medalists
 List of Olympic medalists in swimming (women)
 List of Stanford University people
 World record progression 200 metres backstroke
 World record progression 400 metres freestyle
 World record progression 4 × 100 metres freestyle relay
 World record progression 4 × 100 metres medley relay

References

External links

 
 

1944 births
Living people
American female freestyle swimmers
American people of Swedish descent
World record setters in swimming
Olympic gold medalists for the United States in swimming
Olympic silver medalists for the United States in swimming
Pan American Games gold medalists for the United States
Swimmers from San Francisco
Stanford University alumni
Swimmers at the 1959 Pan American Games
Swimmers at the 1960 Summer Olympics
Medalists at the 1960 Summer Olympics
Pan American Games medalists in swimming
Medalists at the 1959 Pan American Games
21st-century American women